Jennifer Ågren (born 5 January 1993 in Västerbotten, Sweden) is a female Swedish Taekwondo practitioner.

References

1993 births
Living people
Swedish female taekwondo practitioners
Taekwondo practitioners at the 2010 Summer Youth Olympics
European Taekwondo Championships medalists
21st-century Swedish women